The gross regional product (GRP) per capita of the German states is given in this article in nominal values, shown in euros. For easy comparison, all GRP figures are converted into US dollars according to annual average exchange rates. All values are rounded to the nearest hundred.

2019

2018

2017

2016

See also 
List of German states by GRP
List of German cities by GDP

Notes

References 

GRP
GRP
Germany, GRP per capita
Gross state product